Sule Shangri-La Hotel (formerly, Traders Hotel) is a hotel located in downtown Yangon. It was the tallest building in Myanmar from 1996 to 1999. The 466-room hotel used to be known as Traders Hotel before it was rebranded in 2014 as Sule Shangri-La Yangon by its owner Shangri-La Hotels and Resorts.

References

Buildings and structures in Yangon
Hotels in Myanmar